Jaan Tõnisson's second cabinet was in office in Estonia from 30 July 1920 to 26 October 1920, when it was succeeded by Ants Piip's cabinet.

Members

This cabinet's members were the following:

References

Cabinets of Estonia